The 2015 Ohio Valley Conference baseball tournament was from May 20 through 24.  The top six regular season finishers will met in the double-elimination tournament, held at The Ballpark at Jackson in Jackson, Tennessee.  earned the conference's automatic bid to the 2015 NCAA Division I baseball tournament.

Seeding and format
The top six regular season finishers will be seeded by conference winning percentage.  Teams will then play a double-elimination tournament, with the top two seeds receiving a single bye.

Results

References

Tournament
Ohio Valley Conference Baseball Tournament
Ohio Valley Conference baseball tournament
Ohio Valley Conference baseball tournament
Baseball in Tennessee
Sports in Jackson, Tennessee